Confessional is the debut album by Danish pop singer Bryan Rice. It was released in Denmark on 24 April 2006 by EMI. The album includes the lead single "No Promises", which was a huge hit in Denmark in late 2005/early 2006, before Shayne Ward covered the song. The album reached No. 4 in the official Danish album chart.

Track listing

Charts

Weekly charts

Certifications

References

External links

2006 debut albums
Bryan Rice albums
EMI Records albums